René Ponk (born 21 October 1971 in Amsterdam) is a Dutch retired footballer who played as a goalkeeper.

Football career
In a professional career which lasted 15 years Ponk appeared in Eredivisie games 120 over the course of eight seasons, with FC Utrecht (six) and Sparta Rotterdam (two). He also competed in Spain with SD Compostela for three years, playing 19 matches in his only campaign in La Liga and suffering team relegation.

Ponk retired in June 2009 at almost 38 years of age, after two seasons with HFC Haarlem in the second division. He subsequently worked as a goalkeeper coach.

Honours
Utrecht
KNVB Cup: 2003–04
Johan Cruyff Shield: 2004

References

External links
Stats at Voetbal International 

1971 births
Living people
Footballers from Amsterdam
Dutch footballers
Association football goalkeepers
Eredivisie players
Eerste Divisie players
FC Utrecht players
VVV-Venlo players
FC Dordrecht players
Sparta Rotterdam players
HFC Haarlem players
La Liga players
Segunda División players
SD Compostela footballers
Dutch expatriate footballers
Expatriate footballers in Spain
Dutch expatriate sportspeople in Spain